The Pothier House is a historic house in Woonsocket, Rhode Island.  This modest L-shaped -story cottage is notable as the longtime home of Woonsocket mayor (and later Governor of Rhode Island) Aram J. Pothier.  Pothier's father purchased the house c. 1881, and it was the younger Pothier's home until his death (while serving as governor) in 1928.

The house was listed on the National Register of Historic Places in 1982.

See also
Aram J. Pothier
National Register of Historic Places listings in Providence County, Rhode Island

References

Houses on the National Register of Historic Places in Rhode Island
Houses completed in 1881
Houses in Woonsocket, Rhode Island
National Register of Historic Places in Providence County, Rhode Island
1881 establishments in Rhode Island